This is the discography of Norwegian DJ and music producer Matoma.

Albums

Extended plays

Singles

As lead artist

As featured artist

Promotional singles

Remixes

Notes

References

Discographies of Norwegian artists
Electronic music discographies